Movses is a village in the Berd Municipality of the Tavush Province of Armenia.

Etymology 
The village is also known as Mosesgegh and Movsesgyugh.

Gallery

References

External links 

World Gazeteer: Armenia – World-Gazetteer.com

Populated places in Tavush Province